Ronald John Greschner (born December 22, 1954) is a Canadian former professional ice hockey defenceman who played in the National Hockey League (NHL) for 16 seasons between 1974 and 1990.

Greschner was selected 32nd overall by the New York Rangers in the 1974 NHL amateur draft. He played in 982 career NHL games, all with the Rangers, scoring 179 goals and 431 assists for 610 points. He also compiled 1,226 penalty minutes. Greschner's best offensive season was the 1977–78 season when he scored 24 goals and 48 assists for 72 points. Greschner was sometimes deployed as a left wing by coach Craig Patrick.

In the 2009 book 100 Ranger Greats, the authors ranked Greschner at No. 12 all-time of the 901 New York Rangers who had played during the team’s first 82 seasons.

Career statistics

Regular season and playoffs

Awards
 WCHL All-Star Team – 1974

Personal life
Greschner was previously married to supermodel Carol Alt. He has five children with his wife, Lori; the family lives in West Palm Beach, Florida. He also led the Ron Greschner Foundation to support autism research and awareness.

References

External links
 
 
 Ron Greschner's site

1954 births
Living people
Canadian ice hockey defencemen
Canadian people of German descent
Ice hockey people from Saskatchewan
New Westminster Bruins players
New York Rangers draft picks
New York Rangers players
Providence Reds players
Vancouver Blazers draft picks